The 2016–17 LNH Division 1 is the 65th season of the LNH Division 1, French premier handball league and the 40th season consisting of only one league. It runs from 21 September 2016 to 8 June 2017.

Team information 

The following 14 clubs compete in the LNH Division 1 during the 2016–17 season:

League table

Schedule and results
In the table below the home teams are listed on the left and the away teams along the top.

Season statistics

Top goalscorers

Monthly awards

References

External links
 Official site 

2016–17 domestic handball leagues
LNH Division 1
LNH Division 1